William Limburg Houck (May 10, 1893 – May 5, 1960) was a Canadian politician.

Born in Buffalo, New York, Houck was a coal dealer, fuel dealer, and merchant before being elected as the Liberal Party of Ontario candidate to the Legislative Assembly of Ontario in 1934, 1937, 1948, and 1951. Houck was Minister without Portfolio in the provincial cabinet from 1937 to 1943. He also served as mayor of Niagara Falls, Ontario from 1947 to 1950.

Houck was the Liberal candidate elected to the House of Commons of Canada from the riding of Niagara Falls in 1953, 1957, and 1958 elections. He served until his death in 1960.

References
 
 

1893 births
1960 deaths
American emigrants to Canada
Liberal Party of Canada MPs
Ontario Liberal Party MPPs
Members of the Executive Council of Ontario
Members of the House of Commons of Canada from Ontario
Politicians from Buffalo, New York
Mayors of Niagara Falls, Ontario